Richard Fitzwilliams (born 14 October 1949) is a British public relations consultant and commentator. He specialises in promoting exhibitions of figurative art such as those of the Royal Society of Portrait Painters and the Threadneedle Prize at the Mall Galleries. He is also a royal commentator and film critic, and has given over 400 television interviews and numerous radio interviews. He was Editor of The International Who’s Who from 1975 to 2001. He lectures on the British honours system and the British Who’s Who, and writes and broadcasts on London arts events.

Professional career

Publishing
Fitzwilliams was Assistant Editor of Africa South of the Sahara (Europa Publications) from 1972 to 1975. He then became Editor of Europa's International Who's Who, the standard work of its type which was founded in 1935. He arranged promotion of The International Who’s Who, which received substantial coverage in Britain and abroad. His work on it was also closely linked to his leisure interests which include cinema, theatre, art, history (especially royal matters) and politics. Editing The International Who’s Who was compared by The Guardian to "painting the Forth Bridge of fame". He writes and lectures on Who's Who. 
He has also discussed this reference book in numerous radio interviews, including BBC Radio 4's Today programme in 2009, and on BBC News.

Public relations 
Since 2002, Fitzwilliams has been press consultant to the Royal Society of Portrait Painters promoting their annual exhibition at the Mall Galleries, their self-portraits exhibition in 2007 and their permanent collection at Girton College, Cambridge. Since 2008, he has been press consultant to the Threadneedle Prize for figurative painting and sculpture. hosted by the Mall Galleries.
He has promoted the Lynn Painter-Stainers Prize since 2009.

Royal commentator
Fitzwilliams is a regular contributor on royal matters to CNN, BBC News Channel, BBC Breakfast TV, Sky News, LBC, CTV News,
and an occasional contributor to al-Jazeera, ITV News, and BBC2 (Jeremy Vine show).

He was the live commentator for CNN on several royal weddings, funerals, state visits, and other major events.

He has given interviews on the Queen’s Birthday and New Year Honours Lists for BBC Breakfast TV, BBC News Channel, Sky News and numerous radio stations for some years.
He lectures on the British honours system.
He also covers Royal Ascot for TV and radio.

In March 2021 he was tricked by a fictional news company created by YouTuber pranksters Josh Pieters and Archie Manners into giving his reaction to the Prince Harry and Meghan Markle interview with Oprah Winfrey two days before the interview was aired.

Film critic
Fitzwilliams's specialities as a film critic are epics, historical films, and films featuring royalty and maritime films, and he has lectured at the National Army Museum on war on screen. Besides numerous reviews, he has given obituaries on TV and radio for many noted actors and directors.

He is a commentator on films and film awards ceremonies for CNN, CBS News, BBC News Channel, Sky News and Al Jazeera. He has been the weekly film reviewer for Talk Radio Europe on the weekly Movies and U programme since 2007 and reviews regularly for Siren FM (co-presenter 2011-).

Newspapers and magazines
Since 1997, Fitzwilliams has been a contributor to The London and UK Datebook, for which he writes the Artscene column, reviewing London arts events, and reviews Royal Ascot and charity events for its Going Places section.

He has written articles in The Daily Telegraph and The Australian and The Express in 2010. He wrote regular articles on international affairs for The Evening Post (South Africa) from 1978 to 1980.

References

External links
 Richard Fitzwilliams official website
 Entry in Debrett’s People of Today 2011
 Fitzwilliams family at thepeerage.com

British film critics
British public relations people
Living people
1949 births